Nation Broadcasting is a British media company headquartered in the Vale of Glamorgan, Wales. It currently owns and operates twelve Independent Local Radio stations across the United Kingdom.

History
Originally known as Town and Country Broadcasting, the Nation name came into being when the company took over XFM South Wales in May 2008 and rebranded the station as Nation Radio.

In June 2018, the company changed the name of Thames Radio to Nation Radio, with this service becoming their national service, with DJs such as Mike Read, Russ Williams and Neil Francis, broadcasting online and on DAB in 2021 from Nation Radio UK's studios in London.

In February 2019, Nation purchased several former Lincs FM Group and Celador Radio services from Bauer Radio, including The Breeze and Sam FM in the Solent region, and KCFM in East Yorkshire, as these stations overlap with pre-existing Bauer assets Wave 105 and Viking FM.

In September 2022 Nation Broadcasting's franchise agreement with Bauer Radio will end. This will result in a series of changes being made to Nation-owned services in September and October 2022, dubbed 'The Big Switch', which will include the removal of Hits Radio and Greatest Hits Radio content from Nation-owned stations in favour of material largely sourced from Nation Radio UK and Easy Radio.

Stations

Wales
Radio Pembrokeshire (Pembrokeshire)
Radio Carmarthenshire (Carmarthenshire, Llanelli}
Bridge FM (Bridgend, purchased from Tindle Radio in 2006)
Easy Radio (Swansea Bay area.  Formerly known as Swansea Bay Radio and Breezy Radio)
Nation Radio Wales, (formerly known as XFM South Wales until purchased from GCap Media on 30 May 2008)
Dragon Radio (Wales, DAB only)

Scotland
Nation Radio Scotland (West Central Scotland 96.3 FM, Dumbarton 103.0 FM and Helensburgh 106.9 FM)

Greater London
Nation Radio UK
Easy Radio UK

North East England
Sun FM (Sunderland), acquired from UKRD in April 2018. Since March 2020, the former Durham FM and Alpha 103.2 were added to Sun FM, following the purchase of these licenses from Helius Media Group.

South East England
Easy Radio South 
Nation Radio South

Yorkshire
Nation Radio East Yorkshire

East of England
Nation Radio Suffolk

Digital services
Nation Broadcasting runs a suite of digital-first thematic music stations, available via DAB+ transmission in a select number of areas, and UK-wide online. As at December 2021, these include:

Nation 60s (on DAB+ across the Channel Islands since 1 December 2021)
Nation 70s (on DAB+ across Portsmouth, Tynemouth and the Channel Islands)
Nation 80s (on DAB+ across Portsmouth, South Shields, Birmingham, Sailsbury, West Wales (DAB) and the Channel Islands)
Nation 90s (on DAB+ across Portsmouth and the Channel Islands)
Nation 00s (on DAB+ across the Channel Islands, Portsmouth and Sailsbury)
Nation Hits (contemporary hit music, on DAB+ across the Channel Islands since 1 December 2021)
Nation Love (ballads, on DAB+ across the Channel Islands)
Nation Party (Party Classics, on DAB+ across Tynemouth and South Sheilds)
Nation Dance (upbeat music, on DAB+ across the Channel Islands)
Nation Rocks (guitar music, on DAB+ across the Channel Islands since 1 August 2021)

Many of the stations were previously carried on small-scale DAB in Glasgow, but this ended with the closure of the Trial Glasgow multiplex in autumn 2021 (in preparation for the new permanent franchise, won by Nation but later sold to Like Media Group, which is due for launch in 2022.)

The group also owns stakes in a number of DAB Digital Radio multiplexes.

Former stations
The group had also owned Radio Hampshire – broadcasting to Southampton and Winchester but this was sold to Play Radio, and then operated under the name The Breeze. Following the purchase of Celador Radio by Bauer Radio in February 2019, the Southampton and Winchester licences, along with a Portsmouth licence subsequently added to the network, were sold to Nation due to overlapping with the existing regional Bauer station Wave 105.

On 31 May 2019, Nation closed Radio Ceredigion and its frequencies are now used to broadcast Nation Radio Wales.

NME Radio
In July 2010, it was announced that Town and Country Broadcasting was to take over the licence to run the NME's spin-off radio station, NME Radio, after it was reduced to an online only service following DX Media pulling out of the venture.

The new NME Radio was launched on Wednesday 1 September 2010 - with familiar group presenters providing live programming for the national NME Radio service. The station also replaced the now defunct Dabbl station on the Cardiff & Newport DAB Multiplex as well as launching a brand new iPhone app.

References

 https://media.info/radio/stations/the-breeze-south-hamps

External links
Nation Broadcasting Website

 
Radio broadcasting companies of the United Kingdom